The 1990–91 Crvena zvezda season is the 46th season in the existence of the club. The team played in the Yugoslav Federal A League and the FIBA European Cup Winners' Cup.

Overview

Players

Squad information

Transactions 
Source:

Players In

|}

Players Out

|}

Compulsory military service 

|}

Competitions

Overall

Overview

Yugoslav Federal League

Regular season

Source: Yugoslav First Basketball League Archive

Matches

Play-out
Standings

Matches

Source

FIBA European Cup Winners' Cup

Top 16

Quarterfinals 
Standings

Matches

Source

Yugoslav Cup

Source

Statistics

Yugoslav League (Regular Season)

References

External links
 KK Crvena zvezda official website

KK Crvena Zvezda seasons
Crvena zvezda